Caroline Dollar (born December 28, 1983) is an American actress.

Life and career
Dollar was born in Greensboro, North Carolina. She attended Needham B. Broughton High School in Raleigh, North Carolina. Like her older sister, actress Aubrey Dollar, she appeared as a child actress in a small number of television miniseries, such as Day-O and Stephen King's Golden Years, while a child, but did not take any roles as an adult until a brief appearance in a 2005 episode of One Tree Hill, "A Multitude of Casualties". She also appeared in the film Remember the Daze (2007), her last screen acting role to date.

Awards and nominations
In 1993 she was nominated for a Young Artist Award at the Young Artist Awards for Best Young Actress Under Ten in a Television Movie for A Mother's Right: The Elizabeth Morgan Story (1992).

Filmography
 1991 Golden Years (2 episodes) as Little Girl
 1991 In a Child's Name (TV Mini-Series) as Astrid
 1992 Day-O (TV Movie) as Cory Connors
 1992 A Mother's Right: The Elizabeth Morgan Story (TV Movie) as Hilary
 1995 Death in Small Doses (TV Movie) as Allison
 2005 One Tree Hill (1 episode, "A Multitude of Casualties") as Energetic Girl
 2007 Remember the Daze as Kiki

References

External links
 
 

1983 births
Actresses from North Carolina
American child actresses
American film actresses
American television actresses
Living people
People from Greensboro, North Carolina
Needham B. Broughton High School alumni
20th-century American actresses
21st-century American actresses